The western olivaceous warbler (Iduna opaca), also known as isabelline warbler, is a "warbler", formerly placed in the Old World warblers when these were a paraphyletic wastebin taxon. It is now considered a member of the acrocephaline warblers, Acrocephalidae, in the tree warbler genus Iduna. It was formerly regarded as part of a wider "olivaceous warbler" species, but as a result of modern taxonomic developments, this species is now usually considered distinct from the eastern olivaceous warbler, Iduna pallida.

It is a small passerine bird, found in dry open country, including cultivation, with bushes or some trees. Two or three eggs are laid in a nest in low undergrowth or a bush. Like most warblers, the western olivaceous warbler is insectivorous.

It is a medium-sized warbler, more like a very pale reed warbler than its relative the melodious warbler. The adults have a plain pale brown back and whitish underparts. The bill is strong and pointed and the legs grey. The sexes are identical, as with most warblers, but young birds are more buff on the belly. 

The western olivaceous warbler breeds in Iberia and north Africa. It is migratory, wintering in sub-Saharan Africa. It is a rare vagrant to northern Europe.

The western olivaceous warbler is larger and has a browner tinge to the upperparts than the eastern olivaceous warbler. It also has a larger bill. The song is a fast nasal babbling.

Distribution

North Africa

The western olivaceous warbler occurs mainly as a passage migrant in southeast Morocco, although it also may breed in some densely vegetated areas there.

References

Fregin, S., M. Haase, U. Olsson, and P. Alström. 2009. Multi-locus phylogeny of the family Acrocephalidae (Aves: Passeriformes) - the traditional taxonomy overthrown. Molecular Phylogenetics and Evolution 52: 866–878.
Sangster, G., J.M. Collinson, P.-A. Crochet, A.G. Knox, D.T. Parkin, L. Svensson, and S.C. Votier. 2011. Taxonomic recommendations for British birds: seventh report. Ibis 153: 883–892.

western olivaceous warbler
Birds of Southern Europe
Birds of North Africa
Birds of West Africa
Fauna of the Iberian Peninsula
western olivaceous warbler
western olivaceous warbler

bg:Малък маслинов присмехулник
fr:Hypolaïs pâle
ka:დიდი ბუტბუტა
hu:Halvány geze
nl:Vale spotvogel
no:Bleksanger
pl:Zaganiacz blady
pt:Felosa-pálida
fi:Vaaleakultarinta
tr:Ak mukallit